Gillian Schieber Flynn (born February 24, 1971) is an American author, screenwriter, and producer. She is known for writing the thriller and mystery novels, Sharp Objects (2006), Dark Places (2009), and Gone Girl (2012), which are all critically acclaimed. Her books have been published in 40 languages and according to The Washington Post, as of 2016 Gone Girl alone has sold more than 15 million copies.

Flynn wrote the script for the 2014 film adaptation of Gone Girl, directed by David Fincher. For it she won the Critics' Choice Movie Award for Best Adapted Screenplay and was nominated for the Writers Guild of America Award for Best Adapted Screenplay and the BAFTA Award for Best Adapted Screenplay, among others.

The author also wrote and produced the HBO limited series adaptation of Sharp Objects—for which she was nominated for a Primetime Emmy Award and a Writers Guild of America Award—and co-wrote with director Steve McQueen the film Widows (2018).

Flynn also worked as a showrunner, writer, and executive producer on Amazon Prime Video's sci-fi thriller series Utopia (2020), which ran for one season.

She is currently writing her fourth novel; it is set to be published by Penguin Random House.

Early life and education 
Flynn was born in Kansas City, Missouri, and raised in midtown Kansas City's Coleman Highlands neighborhood. Both of her parents were professors at Metropolitan Community College–Penn Valley: her mother, Judith Ann (née Schieber), was a reading-comprehension professor, and her father, Edwin Matthew Flynn, was a film professor. She has an older brother, Travis, who is a railroad machinist. Her uncle is Jackson County Circuit Court Judge Robert Schieber. Flynn was "painfully shy" and found escape in reading and writing. When she was growing up, Flynn's father would take her to watch horror movies.

Flynn attended Bishop Miege High School and graduated in 1989. As a young woman, she worked odd jobs which required her to do things such as dress up as a giant "yogurt cone who wore a tuxedo."

She attended the University of Kansas, where she received her undergraduate degrees in English and journalism. She spent two years in California, writing at a trade magazine for human resources professionals, before moving to Chicago and attending Northwestern University for a master's degree at its Medill School of Journalism in 1997. Flynn initially wanted to work as a police reporter, but she chose to focus on her own writing, as she discovered she had "no aptitude" for police reporting.

Career 
After graduating from Northwestern, Flynn worked freelance briefly at U.S. News & World Report before being hired as a feature writer in 1998 at Entertainment Weekly. She was promoted to television critic and wrote about films but was laid off in December 2008.

She attributes her craft to her 15-some years in journalism. She said, "I could not have written a novel if I hadn't been a journalist first, because it taught me that there's no muse that's going to come down and bestow upon you the mood to write. You just have to do it. I'm definitely not precious."

Some critics have accused Flynn of misogyny due to the often unflattering depiction of female characters in her books. Flynn identifies as a feminist. She feels that feminism allows for women to be bad characters in literature. She states, "The one thing that really frustrates me is this idea that women are innately good, innately nurturing." Flynn also said people will dismiss "trampy, vampy, bitchy types – but there's still a big pushback against the idea that women can be just pragmatically evil, bad, and selfish." In 2015, Flynn explained her decision to write cruel female characters, saying, "I've grown quite weary of the spunky heroines, brave rape victims, soul-searching fashionistas that stock so many books. I particularly mourn the lack of female villains – good, potent female villains."

In 2021, it was announced that Flynn would be running a book imprint for the newly founded independent publisher Zando.

Books 
When Flynn was working for Entertainment Weekly, she was also writing novels during her free time. She has written three novels and one short story.

Sharp Objects (2006) revolves around a serial killer in a Missouri town, and the reporter who has returned to her hometown from Chicago to cover the event. Themes include dysfunctional families, violence and self-harm. The book was partly inspired by Dennis Lehane's Mystic River. In 2007, the book was shortlisted for the Mystery Writers of America Edgar for Best First Novel by an American Writer, Crime Writers' Association Duncan Lawrie, CWA New Blood and Ian Fleming Steel Daggers, winning in the last two categories. Sharp Objects was adapted into a 2018 television miniseries, starring Amy Adams.
Dark Places (2009)  is about a woman who investigates whether or not her incarcerated brother was truly responsible for the murder of their family in the 1980s, which happened when she was a child during the era of panic about Satanic ritual abuse. Dark Places was adapted into a feature film, written and directed by Gilles Paquet-Brenner. The cast included Charlize Theron, Nicholas Hoult, Christina Hendricks, Drea de Matteo, Chloë Grace Moretz, and Sean Bridgers. The film was released on August 7, 2015. Flynn made a cameo appearance in the film.
 Gone Girl (2012) was released in June 2012 and  concerns Nick Dunne, a small town Missouri creative writing professor whose wife, Amy, disappears on their fifth wedding anniversary. Gone Girl was No. 1 on the New York Times Hardcover Fiction Bestseller list for eight weeks. Culture writer Dave Itzkoff wrote that the novel was, except for the Fifty Shades trilogy, the biggest literary phenomenon of 2012. By the end of that year, Gone Girl had sold over two million copies in print and digital editions, according to the book's publisher. Flynn wrote the script for a film adaptation of Gone Girl after 20th Century Fox purchased the film rights for $1.5 million. The film was directed by David Fincher, who also collaborated with Flynn on the screenplay, and starred Ben Affleck as Nick and Rosamund Pike as Amy and was released on October 3, 2014 to both critical acclaim and box office success.
The Grownup (2015) was originally published as a short story in the 2014 anthology Rogues, edited by George R. R. Martin and Gardner Dozois, under the title "What Do You Do?". The story is about a sex worker who becomes a fake psychic and aura reader, and is then hired by a woman with a failing marriage and a disturbing stepson to purify her Victorian home. The story won the 2015 Edgar Award for Best Short Story. Flynn herself currently writing the film adaptation, as she mentioned in the Chanel Connects podcast in June 2022.

Comic book 
Flynn was an avid reader of comic and graphic novels when she was a child. She collaborated with illustrator Dave Gibbons and wrote a comic book story called Masks. It is part of the anthology series Dark Horse Presents and was published by Dark Horse Comics in February 2015.

Television writing 
Flynn was executive producer and cowriter, along with Marti Noxon, on the HBO adaptation of her novel Sharp Objects starring Amy Adams. The miniseries was released in 2018 and received critical acclaim.

In February 2014, it was reported that Flynn would be writing the scripts for Utopia, an HBO drama series adapted from the acclaimed British series Utopia. The HBO series was to be directed and executive produced by David Fincher. In July 2015 the project was cancelled due to budget disputes between Fincher and HBO. However, the project received second life at Amazon, with the streamer ordering the project to series with a 2020 release. Flynn wrote all eight episodes and served as the project's showrunner. Utopia was released on Amazon Prime Video on September 25, 2020. In November 2020, the series was canceled after one season.

Film 
For her Gone Girl screenplay, Flynn was nominated for the Golden Globe, Writers Guild of America Award and BAFTA Award for Best Adapted Screenplay. Flynn and filmmaker Steve McQueen co-wrote a film adaptation of the ITV series Widows. The film stars Viola Davis, Michelle Rodriguez, Colin Farrell, Liam Neeson, Daniel Kaluuya, and Robert Duvall, and was released in November 2018 to critical acclaim.

Personal life 
Flynn married lawyer Brett Nolan in 2007. They met during graduate school at Northwestern, and began a relationship in their thirties. They have two children. Their son Flynn was born in 2010 and their daughter Veronica was born in 2014. They reside in Chicago.

Bibliography

Fiction 
Sharp Objects (2006)
Dark Places (2009)
Gone Girl (2012)
The Grownup (short story) (2014)

Non-fiction 
 
 
 
 
 
 Gillian Flynn's Entertainment Weekly articles

Filmography

Film

TV

Awards and nominations

Literature

Won

2015 Edgar Award for Best Short Story for The Grownup

Film and TV

Gone Girl 

Won (selected):

Critics' Choice Movie Award for Best Adapted Screenplay
Chicago Film Critics Association Award for Best Adapted Screenplay
Online Film Critics Society Award for Best Adapted Screenplay
Washington D.C. Area Film Critics Association Award for Best Adapted Screenplay

Nominations (selected):

BAFTA Award for Best Adapted Screenplay
Golden Globe Award for Best Screenplay
Satellite Award for Best Adapted Screenplay
USC Scripter Award
Writers Guild of America Award for Best Adapted Screenplay

Sharp Objects 

Nominations (selected):

Gotham Independent Film Award for Breakthrough Series – Long Form
Primetime Emmy Award for Outstanding Limited or Anthology Series
Producers Guild of America Award for Best Limited Series Television
USC Scripter Award (shared with Marti Noxon; for the episode "Vanish")
Writers Guild of America Award for Television: Long Form – Adapted

Widows 

Nominations (selected):

Black Reel Award for Outstanding Screenplay (shared with director Steve McQueen)
London Film Critics' Circle Award for Screenwriter of the Year (shared with director Steve McQueen)
Online Film Critics Society Award for Best Adapted Screenplay  (shared with director Steve McQueen)

References

Further reading 
 Stratton, Beth. "Altering the Hypermasculine through the Feminine: Female Masculinity in Gillian Flynn's Gone Girl." Clues: A Journal of Detection, vol. 38, no. 1, 2020, pp. 19–27.

External links 

 
 

1971 births
21st-century American non-fiction writers
21st-century American novelists
21st-century American women writers
American comics writers
American crime writers
American film critics
American mystery novelists
American television critics
American thriller writers
American women journalists
American women novelists
American women screenwriters
Bishop Miege High School alumni
Edgar Award winners
Female comics writers
Living people
Medill School of Journalism alumni
University of Kansas alumni
Writers from Kansas City, Missouri
Writers from Chicago
Women mystery writers
American women film critics
Women thriller writers
Screenwriters from Missouri
Novelists from Illinois
Novelists from Missouri
The New Yorker people
Screenwriters from Illinois
21st-century American screenwriters